The following lists events that happened during 1964 in Singapore.
 Singapore was still part of the Federation of Malaysia

Incumbents
 Yang di-Pertuan Negara – Yusof Ishak
 Prime Minister – Lee Kuan Yew

Events

January
1 January – The Singapore Tourism Promotion Board (present day Singapore Tourism Board) is formed to promote Singapore as a destination for visitors.
 20 January – Cold Storage's new carbon dioxide factory is officially opened, which is required for dry ice and carbonated drinks.

February
12 February – The Housing and Development Board launches a new scheme known as the Home Ownership for the People Scheme. This enabled Singaporeans to buy flats for a lease of 99 years.

March
 1 March – The People's Action Party decides to send in candidates for the 1964 Malaysian general election, which is held on 25 April. The decision caused an outroar in Kuala Lumpur. It only won the Bangsar seat.
 31 March – The Khong Guan Flour Milling factory is officially opened, making it the first flour mill in Singapore. This will allow biscuit companies and bakeries to rely on locally produced flour instead of imported flour.

April
1 April – The Port of Singapore Authority is formed, taking over the previous Singapore Harbour Board and the Master Attendant.
24 April – The Singapore Tourism Promotion Board adopts the Merlion as its new emblem.

May
 20 May – The Singapore Tourism Promotion Board's new office is officially opened.

July
21 July – The 1964 racial riots occurred between Malays and Chinese, during a birthday celebration procession of Prophet Muhammad. By the end of the riots, 23 people are killed, with 454 others injured.

August
13 August – After a series of blasts caused by the Confrontation, a sea curfew is imposed so as to prevent saboteurs from setting into Singapore, resulting in fishermen not being able to fish at night.

September
2 September – The second racial riot occurred between Malays and Chinese after the murder of a Malay Trishaw rider. By the time the riots ended, 13 people are killed, with 106 injured.

October
31 October – Malaysia Dairy Industries new factory is officially opened to produce condensed milk locally. It has since branched into fruit juices and other dairy products.

November
28 November – The Singapore Institute of Management is registered as Singapore's first management institute. It aims to create a pool of industrial managers for the newly built factories, which are important for Singapore's economy.

December
December – Work starts on Toa Payoh, which will house 250,000 people when completed.
4–21 December – The first sports festival, Pesta Sukan, is held in Singapore.

Births
 29 March – Grace Fu, Minister of Sustainability and the Environment
 26 April – Nicky Moey, writer.
 6 June – Junie Sng, Olympic swimmer
 22 August – Kelvin Tan, musician, writer and lecturer.
 20 November – Ong Keng Sen, artistic director of TheatreWorks.
 24 December – Tan See Leng, Minister for Manpower and Second Minister for Trade and Industry.
 Sabri Buang, writer, theatre director.
 Philip Jeyaretnam, counsel, writer.
 Liang Wern Fook, Chinese literature pioneer.

Deaths
 24 January – Lee Wee Nam – Entrepreneur, community leader (b. 1881).
 20 June – Loke Wan Tho – Cathay Organisation founder (b. 1915).
 1 July – Awang Bakar – Footballer (b. 1930/1936).

References

 
Singapore
Years in Singapore